BTS 74,398 is a centrally acting stimulant drug which was developed for the treatment of Parkinson's disease. It inhibits the synaptic reuptake of dopamine, serotonin and noradrenaline, making it a triple reuptake inhibitor. It was effective in animal models of Parkinson's disease, but was unsuccessful in human trials.

See also

SPD-473 is the identity of the species that appears in the patents.

References 

Stimulants
Chlorobenzenes
Secondary amines
Thioethers
Ethyleneamines
Cyclobutanes